John Whyte may refer to:

John Whyte (pastoralist) (c. 1826–1902), pastoralist and grocer in Whyte, Counsell & Co. in South Australia
John Whyte (politician) (1838–1924), former merchant and politician in Quebec
John B. Whyte (1928–2004), American model and real estate entrepreneur
John Blair Whyte (1840–1914), member of parliament and mayor in the Waikato Region of New Zealand
John Henry Whyte (1928–1990), Irish historian and political scientist
John Whyte (died 1913), Scottish journalist, translator of Gaelic, and librarian, see Alexander Macbain
John Whyte, a London entrepreneur who built the Kensington Hippodrome
Jock Whyte (1921–1998), Scottish former footballer

See also
Jack Whyte (1940–2021), Scottish-Canadian novelist
John Whyte-Melville-Skeffington, 13th Viscount Massereene (1914–1992), British politician and landowner
John White (disambiguation)